Britz may refer to:

Places in Germany
Britz, a part of the Neukölln district in Berlin
Britz Canal in Berlin
Berlin-Britz transmitter 
Britz-Süd (Berlin U-Bahn), a Berlin U-Bahn station
Schloss Britz, a former manor-house in Berlin-Neukölln
Britz, Brandenburg, a town in the district of Barnim in Brandenburg
Britz railway station in Britz, Brandenburg
Britz-Chorin, an Amt ("collective municipality") in Barnim, Brandenburg
Britz-Chorin-Oderberg, an Amt ("collective municipality") in Barnim, Brandenburg

Other
Britz (film), a two-part British television drama film
Britz, a rental campervan brand of Tourism Holdings Limited in New Zealand
SV Stern Britz 1889, a German football club 
Britz (surname)